BPS-500 is a missile boat in service with the Vietnam People's Navy. It was the only missiles boat built under the project KBO 2000 where Vietnam started to domestically built this class in the late 1990s. KBO 2000 is a joint project between the Ukrainian State Research and Design Shipbuilding Center and Vietnam in order to built missile boats in Vietnam with assistance from Russia. Russia which is represented by Severnoye Project Design Bureau (SPKB) is involved in the design scheme of missile boats of the BPS-500 class as required by the Vietnam Navy.

References

Ships of the Vietnam People's Navy
Missile boats
Ships built in Vietnam